Eugene Louis Corbett (October 25, 1913 – January 28, 2009) was a first baseman in Major League Baseball who played for the Philadelphia Phillies between  and . Born in Winona, Minnesota, he batted left-handed and threw right-handed.

Corbett played with the Phillies in part of three seasons. In a 37-game career, he was a .120 hitter (13-for-108) with two home runs and 10 RBI, including 12 runs and three doubles. Following his majors career, he was traded for first baseman/outfielder Phil Weintraub and played for the Baltimore Orioles of the International League.

Corbett was the last living position player (non-pitcher) to have played at Baker Bowl, the Phillies home ballpark between May 2, and June 30, 1938, while a member of the Phillies.

External links

Minor League Baseball history
Retrosheet
Obituary

1913 births
2009 deaths
Albany Cardinals players
Allentown Cardinals players
Baltimore Orioles (IL) players
Baseball players from Minnesota
Buffalo Bisons (minor league) players
Decatur Commodores players
Hazleton Mountaineers players
Kansas City Blues (baseball) players
Major League Baseball first basemen
Newark Bears (IL) players
Philadelphia Phillies players
Sacramento Solons players
St. Louis Cardinals scouts
St. Paul Saints (AA) players
Salisbury Cardinals players
Winnipeg Maroons (baseball) players